Events in the year 1859 in Brazil.

Incumbents
Monarch – Pedro II.
Prime Minister – Viscount of Abaeté (until 10 August), Baron of Uruguaiana (starting 10 August).

Events

Births

Deaths

References

1850s in Brazil
Years of the 19th century in Brazil
Brazil
Brazil